Sepp Lichtenegger (born 13 November 1937) is an Austrian ski jumper. He competed at the 1964 Winter Olympics and the 1968 Winter Olympics.

References

1937 births
Living people
Austrian male ski jumpers
Olympic ski jumpers of Austria
Ski jumpers at the 1964 Winter Olympics
Ski jumpers at the 1968 Winter Olympics
People from Gmunden District
Sportspeople from Upper Austria
20th-century Austrian people